Coprosma tenuifolia, also called wavy-leaved coprosma, is a shrub or small tree that is native to New Zealand. C. tenuifolia grows to 5 metres high and has orange fruit.

References

tenuifolia
Flora of New Zealand
Taxa named by Thomas Frederic Cheeseman